Michael Thomas is an American author. He won the 2009 International Dublin Literary Award for his debut novel Man Gone Down, receiving a prize of €100,000. Man Gone Down is also recommended by The New York Times.

Early and personal life
Thomas was born and raised in Boston. He studied for a bachelor's degree at Hunter College in New York City, where he now teaches, and for a master's at Warren Wilson College. He currently lives in New York City, claiming to have never had a proper job although he has worked in several areas, including bars, restaurants, construction, pizza delivery, on film sets and driving a taxi. Thomas is married and lives with his wife and three children in Brooklyn.

Writing career
Prior to his international success as a novelist, Thomas wrote poetry and performed in the capacity of a singer-songwriter. Later, whilst attending graduate school, he studied a fiction program, with his thesis being a collection of short stories. One of these short stories became his debut novel.

Man Gone Down

Thomas's debut novel, Man Gone Down, won the 2009 International Dublin Literary Award on 11 June 2009. The prize, which is the richest literary award in the world (apart from the Nobel Prize in Literature) and is open to novels written in all languages, was €100,000 (£85,000, US$140,000). Thomas was the third author to win with a debut novel, following Andrew Miller's Ingenious Pain (1999) and Rawi Hage's De Niro's Game (2007).

The book was praised by the judges, who included James Ryan, for its "energy and warmth" and for being "tuned urgently to the way we live now". Thomas said he had been "feeling a little desperate" during the writing of it. Man Gone Down beat an international longlist of 147 titles from 41 countries, as well as seven other shortlisted nominations such as The Brief Wondrous Life of Oscar Wao by Junot Diaz and The Reluctant Fundamentalist by Mohsin Hamid, as well as novels by established authors such as Doris Lessing, Joyce Carol Oates and Philip Roth. It was nominated by the National Library Service of Barbados. In 2007, Man Gone Down was named in the top ten of a list by The New York Times.

Thomas attended the prize ceremony in Dublin, saying he was "stunned" and "still waiting for the punch line". He expressed his disbelief that he had even made the shortlist – "or the longlist, for that matter". He expects to "pay some bills" with the money as well as "a mortgage, a half-built house".

The novel deals with an African-American man who is estranged from his white wife and their children. He must come up with a sum of money within four days to have them returned. It focuses on an attempt to achieve the American Dream. Thomas describes Man Gone Down as having a "gallows humour". Thomas is currently working on his second book, intended to be non-fiction.

References

Year of birth missing (living people)
Living people
21st-century American novelists
African-American novelists
American male novelists
Hunter College alumni
Warren Wilson College alumni
Hunter College faculty
Writers from Boston
Writers from Brooklyn
21st-century American male writers
Novelists from New York (state)
Novelists from Massachusetts
21st-century American non-fiction writers
American male non-fiction writers
21st-century African-American writers
African-American male writers